Bead Town is a traveling art exhibit of 100 huge mosaics composed of recycled Mardi Gras beads. Created by carpenter and artist Stephan Wanger in New Orleans, Louisiana, Bead Town has been exhibited in Winnsboro, Louisiana, Natchitoches, Louisiana, and Gary, Indiana.

References

External links 
 Galeria Alegria
 KNOE 8 NEWS Mardi Gras Beads turned into Modern-day Art
 Best of New Orleans: Bead Town Mosaics made out of Mardi Gras Beads
 NolaVie: Bead Artist aims for New World Record
 Huffingtonpost.com: Super Bowl plus Mardi Gras
 The Advocate: Beads Color World
 Nola.com: Mardi Gras Throws fuel Slidell
 Nola.com Stephan Wanger transforms

Mardi Gras in New Orleans
Traveling exhibits
Beadwork